Tarraco is the ancient name of the current city of Tarragona (Catalonia, Spain). It was the oldest Roman settlement on the Iberian Peninsula. It became the capital of the Roman province of Hispania Citerior during the period of the Roman Republic, and of Hispania Tarraconensis following the latter's creation during the Roman Empire.

In 2000, the archaeological ensemble of Tarraco was declared a World Heritage Site by UNESCO.

History

Origins and the Second Punic War

The municipality was inhabited in pre-Roman times by Iberians who had commercial contacts with the Greeks and Phoenicians who settled on the coast. The Iberian colonies were mainly located in the Ebro Valley. Evidence of Iberian colonies in the municipality of Tarragona has been dated to the 5th century BC.

References in the literature to the presence of Iberians in Tarraco are ambiguous. Livy mentions an oppidum parvum (small town) called Cissis and Polybius talks about a polis called Kissa (Κίσσα). Tarraco is mentioned for first time shortly after the arrival of Gnaeus Cornelius Scipio Calvus at Empúries in 218 BC at the start of the Second Punic War which began the Roman conquest of Hispania. Livy writes that the Romans conquered a field of Punic supplies for Hannibal's troops near Cissis and took the city. A short time later, the Romans were attacked "not far from Tarraco" (haud procul Tarracone). But it remains unclear whether Cissis and Tarraco were the same city. A coin found in Empúries bears the inscription Tarakon-salir (salir probably means silver). The coin, engraved in keeping with other Empúries models at an undisclosed location, is generally dated to 250 BC, certainly before the arrival of the Romans. The name Kesse appears on coins of Iberian origin from the 1st and 2nd century BC that were marked according to Roman weight standards. Kesse may be equated with Cissis, the place of origin of the Cissisians mentioned by Pliny.

In 217 BC reinforcements arrived from Italy under the command of Publius Scipio, and he and his brother Gnaeus Cornelius are attributed with the fortification of Tarraco and the establishment of a military port, and as Pliny the Elder said: Tarraco Scipionum opus, Tarraco was work by the Scipios as Carthage was by the Carthaginians. The Roman city wall was probably constructed on top of the more ancient wall characteristic of the Iberian stonemason.

After the death of the Scipio brothers, Tarraco was 25-year-old Scipio Africanus's (son of Publius) winter base between 211 and 210, and where he met the tribes of Hispania in conventus. The population was largely loyal to the Romans during the war. Livy called them allies and friends of the Roman people (socii et amici populi Romani) and the fishermen of Tarraco (piscatores Tarraconenses) served with their boats during the siege of Carthago Nova.

The conquest of the Iberian Peninsula by the Romans took over 200 years.

Roman Republic
During the following two centuries Tarraco remained a supply and winter base camp during the wars against the Celtiberians, as it was during the Second Punic War. There was therefore a strong military presence during this period, possibly in the highest area of what is currently  the city's historic quarter, called the Part Alta. In 197 BC, all of the conquered areas, even narrow strips along the Mediterranean coast, were divided between the new provinces of Hispania Ulterior and Hispania Citerior. The capital of Hispania Citerior was principally Carthago Nova but Strabo says that the governors also resided in Tarraco.

The legal status of Tarraco is not entirely clear. It was probably organized as conventus civium Romanorum (convent = meeting of Roman citizens of the province) during the Republic, with two magistri (civilian directors) at its head. Gaius Porcius Cato, consul in the year 114 BC, chose Tarraco as the place of his exile in the year 108, indicating that Tarraco was a free city or perhaps an ally at that time.

According to Strabo, one of the "most recent" of the Roman battles took place not far from Tarraco. When Caesar conquered supporters of Pompey in 49 BC in Ilerda (Lleida), Tarraco supported his army with food. It is not entirely clear whether Tarraco received the status of colony at the hand of Julius Caesar or Augustus, but current research tends to assume that was the former who granted it after his victory in Munda, around the year 45BC, and reflected in the epithet Iulia in its formal name: Colonia Iulia Urbs Triumphalis Tarraco, which would remain for the duration of the Empire.

Age of Augustus 

In 27 BC, Emperor Augustus went to Spain to monitor the campaigns in Cantabria. However, due to his poor health he preferred to stay in Tarraco. Apparently, Augustus had built an altar in the city, and a story by the rhetorician Quintilian mentions that the inhabitants of Tarraco boasted to Augustus that a palm tree had miraculously grown on the altar. He replied drily that that would mean it was not used very often.

Soon after he arrived the old via Herculea became the Via Augusta. A milestone, found in Tarragona's Plaça de Braus, mentions the road between 12 and 6 BC, leading to Barcino to the north-east and Dertosa, Saguntum and (Valentia) to the south.

The city flourished under Augustus. The writer Pomponius Mela describes it in the 1st century AD as follows: "Tarraco is the richest port on this coast" (Tarraco urbs est en his oris maritimarum opulentissima). Tarraco under Augustus and Tiberius minted its own coins with depictions of the imperial cult and the inscription CVT, CVTT o CVTTAR.

After the death of Augustus in the year 14 AD, the emperor was officially deified and in 15 AD a temple was erected in his honour, probably in the easternmost neighbourhood of the city or near the Colonial Forum, as mentioned by Tacitus in his annales.

High Empire 

In 68 AD Galba, who lived in Tarraco for eight years, was proclaimed emperor in Clunia Sulpicia. Vespasian began a reorganization of the precarious finances of the state. According to Pliny, this allowed Latin citizenship to be granted to the inhabitants of Hispania. The Iberian peninsula, which since ancient times consisted of urban areas and a land divided by tribal organizations, was transformed into areas organized around urban centers, whether in colonies or municipalities, thereby facilitating tax collection. A rapid increase in construction took place, possibly due to the reorganization of the province. Tarragona Amphitheatre, the temple area, and the Provincial forum at the top of the city were probably built during this period. Most of the statues at these locations were probably placed there between 70 and 180 AD.

The patron of the city Senator Lucius Licinius Sura was appointed under the Emperor Trajan. Sura came from Tarraconensis and reached one of the highest offices of state. In the winter 122-123 AD Hadrian is thought to have visited the city to hold a conventus for Hispania. He also rebuilt the temple of Augustus.

Tarraco started experiencing severe economic difficulties at the end of the 2nd century AD. Few statues were built in honor of the city, probably due to a lack of funds. This period also saw the defeat of the struggle against the Emperor Clodius Albinus, who was supported by the governor of Tarraconensis Novio, Lucius Rufo. At this time inscriptions dedicated to Provinciae Concilium start to disappear to be increasingly replaced by inscriptions dedicated to members of the military. There started being fewer influential merchants in the ordo decurionum (civil administration) and more patroni (large landowners and public senior officials). Severus rebuilt the amphitheater and associated structures, as evidenced by an inscription at the bottom.

Late antiquity

After the imperial administration reforms of Diocletian, the peninsula became a diocese divided into six provinces that were much smaller than before. Tarraco remained the capital, but of a much smaller province.

The invasions in about 260 by groups of both Franks and Alemanni created hardships for a decade but excavations have not shown effects of these raids within the city and destruction has only been seen in the harbour area and outside the walls.

A portico of Jupiter was built between Diocletian and Maximian (286 to 293) which may be part of a basílica.

In 476, following the collapse of Roman defenses along the Rhine, Tarraco was occupied by the Visigoths and King Euric. There is no evidence of destruction and apparently the capture of the city was relatively quiet. The Visigoths probably took over existing structures by establishing a small group of nobles, which the existence of Christian tombs in this period seems to confirm. The end of the ancient history of the city came with the arrival of the Muslims in 713 or 714.

Archaeological ensemble
The archaeological ensemble of Tarraco is one of the largest archaeological sites of Roman Hispania preserved in Spain today. It was declared a World Heritage Site by UNESCO in 2000. The city of Tarraco is the oldest Roman settlement on the Iberian Peninsula, having become the capital of the province of Hispania Citerior in the 1st century BC.

There are still many important Roman ruins in Tarragona. Part of the foundations of the large Cyclopean walls near the Pilate's offices are believed to be of pre-Roman origins. This building, which was a prison in the 19th century, is said to be the palace of Augustus.

Tarraco, like many ancient cities, has remained inhabited, and has been slowly dismantled by its own citizens for building materials. In spite of this the amphitheater, located near the seashore and long used as a quarry, stands with large parts of its structure surviving. It was built after the circus, and measures 45.72 meters long, although some sections of it may still be undocumented.

Inscriptions on the stones of houses written in Latin and even in Phoenician can be found throughout the city.

Two ancient monuments, a small distance from the city, have aged well. The first is a magnificent aqueduct, which crosses a valley  from the city gates.

UNESCO status

UNESCO included the ruins of the ancient Roman city of Tarraco that on its list of World Heritage Sites because they meet two criteria:

Protected sites

See also
 Romanization of Hispania

References

External links 

 UNESCO website
 Tarraco, World heritage site

Roman sites in Spain
Roman towns and cities in Spain
Archaeological sites in Spain
Tarragona
World Heritage Sites in Spain
Cities founded by Rome